Alfred Rawlinson may refer to:

 Sir Alfred Rawlinson, 3rd Baronet (1867–1934), British pioneer motorist and aviator, soldier and intelligence officer
 Alfred Rawlinson (bishop) (1884–1960), Bishop of Derby, 1935–1959
Sir Alfred Frederick Rawlinson, 4th Baronet (1900–1969) of the Rawlinson baronets